Enchiriadis may refer to:

Musica enchiriadis (Music Manual), a 9th-century music theory treatise
Scolica enchiriadis (Commentary on the Manual), an extension of the above treatise
a Spanish record label founded by Raúl Mallavibarrena director of Musica Ficta (Spain)